The First Kohl cabinet was the state government of the German state of Rhineland-Palatinate from 19 May 1969 until 18 May 1971. The Cabinet was headed by Minister President Helmut Kohl and was formed by the Christian Democratic Union and the Free Democratic Party after the resignation of Minister President Peter Altmeier. On 19 May 1969 Kohl was elected and sworn in as Minister President by the Landtag of Rhineland-Palatinate. It was succeeded by Kohl's second and third cabinets.

Composition 

|}

References 

Cabinets of Rhineland-Palatinate
Cabinet Kohl 1 (Rhineland-Palatinate)